Bren is a surname. Notable people with the surname include:

Donald Bren (born 1932), American businessman
Frank Bren (born 1943), Australian actor and playwright
J. Robert Bren (1903 – 1981), Mexican-American filmmaker
Llywelyn Bren (died 1318), Welsh rebel
Matevž Bren (born 1954), Slovenian mathematician
Steve Bren (born 1960), American racing driver